Jasmina Aleksandrov , maiden  Ilić, (Serbian Cyrillic: Јасмина Илић Александров; born 11 April 1985 in Bečej, SFR Yugoslavia) is a Serbian former professional basketball player. During the 2009–10 season she played for Panathinaikos of Athens. Jasmina appeared in the Greek edition of popular magazine Maxim, also was on the cover of Serbians Playboy magazine edition, as well as on the cover of Esquire Magazine Serbia.  After retirement from professional basketball Jasmina started fitness projects in Serbia and got into CrossFit and Spartan Race competitions. Jasmina participated in three Spartan Race world championships representing Serbia.

Jasmina is a vegan and actively involved in environmental projects in Serbia. She is owner and coach at Hangar training and performance center and Under Armour brand ambassador.

Personal life
Her father Predrag was professional football player and her mother Verica was a professional handball player. Her husband is Nemanja Aleksandrov, Serbian basketball player. They were married in 2011.

References

External links
 Jasmina Ilic profile
 Jasmina Ilic Maxim photos
 Profile at eurobasket.com

1985 births
Living people
People from Bečej
Serbian women's basketball players
Shooting guards
Small forwards
Panathinaikos WBC players
ŽKK Vojvodina players
Serbian expatriate basketball people in the United States
Serbian expatriate basketball people in France
Serbian expatriate basketball people in Romania
Serbian expatriate basketball people in Germany
Serbian expatriate basketball people in Greece